= Tassvir Saal Festival =

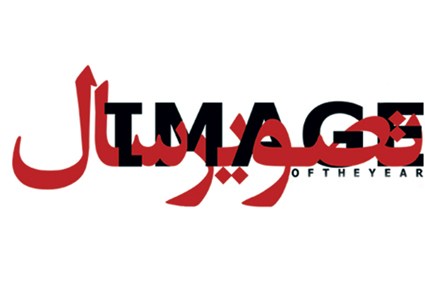
- Location: Tehran, Iran
- Founded: 2003
- Directors: Seifollah Samadian
- Website: www.tassvir.com

Iran's annual Tassvir Saal Festival or Image of the Year Festival (Persian: جشن تصویر سال), has been held every February and March in Tehran since 2003.

This festival has four different sections: Photography, Film, Graphic Design/Caricature, and the Mohsen Rasoulof Prize is awarded to young participants under 25 years old. The festival is held annually during the winter season.
